Joseph Scott Geller (born March 7, 1954) is a Democratic politician who currently serves as a member of the Florida House of Representatives, representing the 100th District, which includes most of Hollywood in southern Broward County and parts of Miami-Dade County, since 2014.

History
Geller was born in The Bronx in New York City in 1954, and moved to the state of Florida in 1965. He attended Northwestern University, but did not graduate, instead receiving his bachelor's degree in history from the Florida State University in 1975. After graduation, Geller then attended the Florida State University College of Law, receiving his Juris Doctor in 1979.

In 1989, he was elected the Chairman of the Miami-Dade County Democratic Party, serving in that capacity in 2000. During the 2000 presidential election, he played a prominent role as an attorney for the Al Gore presidential campaign. During the recount, Geller, seeking to confirm a theory that some Gore voters had accidentally punched the wrong hole in their ballots, requested a sample ballot from the Supervisor of Elections' office. After receiving the ballot from a clerk, Geller was accused of stealing a ballot, was mobbed by protesters, and had to be escorted to safety by police. "I requested [the sample ballot], which I'm entitled to do," Geller said. "It was clearly marked 'sample ballot for use by Democratic Party.' The whole transaction was out in the open and all very calmly done. This Republican observer — a woman with blond hair, a suit and clipboard — was watching the whole thing. But the moment I started to walk away, she sicced the crowd on me. She said I was stealing a ballot and they surrounded me. It was all orchestrated."

Geller ran for Mayor of North Bay Village, a small city in northeastern Miami-Dade County, in 2004. He faced Frank DiMaggio and was able to win narrowly, receiving 54% of the vote to DiMaggio's 46%.

Florida House of Representatives
When incumbent State Representative Dan Gelber was unable to seek re-election due to term limits in 2008, Geller ran to succeed him in the 106th District, which stretched from Fisher Island to Golden Beach in eastern Miami-Dade County. He faced Richard L. Steinberg in the Democratic primary, and he lost to Steinberg handily, receiving only 31% of the vote to Steinberg's 69%.

In 2014, incumbent State Representative Joseph Gibbons was unable to seek re-election in the 100th District, so Geller ran in the Democratic primary to replace him, declaring, "My style is to be a consensus builder to build bridges between people. I’m a progressive. And I make no bones about being a progressive. But I have also lived in other parts of the state. I think I can do some good up there. I think I can make a difference. I think I can make this a better state." He faced teacher John Paul Alvarez and pastor Ben Sorenson in the Democratic primary, and earned the endorsement of the Miami Herald, which praised him as a candidate who "knows this bi-county district well," and noted that the district "stands to benefit from his legislative priorities." Ultimately, Geller defeated his opponents handily, receiving 62% of the vote to Sorensen's 20% and Alvarez's 18%. In the general election, Geller faced fellow attorney Marty Feigenbaum and once again earned the endorsement of the Herald, which said that he was "thoroughly familiar with the issues."

In April 2022, Geller argued that the effort to repeal the Reedy Creek Improvement Act was "disrespectful of the legislative process."

References

External links
Florida House of Representatives - Joe Geller
Joseph S. Geller

Florida State University College of Law alumni
Democratic Party members of the Florida House of Representatives
1954 births
Living people
21st-century American politicians